Oesterley, a surname of German origin, may refer to:

Carl Wilhelm Friedrich Oesterley (1805–1891), German painter and art historian
Carl August Heinrich Ferdinand Oesterley (1839–1930), German landscape painter
 (1834–1891), German historian
 (1842–1917), German painter
William Oscar Emil (W.O.E.) Oesterley (1866–1950), British theologian

German-language surnames